Kampot is a province in southwestern Cambodia. It borders the provinces of Koh Kong and Kampong Speu to the north, Takéo to the east, Kep and the country of Vietnam (Kiên Giang) to the south, and Sihanoukville to the west. To its south it has a coastline of around 45 km on the Gulf of Thailand. It is rich in low arable lands and has abundant natural resources. Its capital is the city of Kampot.

Kampot Province had a population of 627,884 in 2010 and consist of eight districts divided into 92 communes with a total of 477 villages. Touk Meas City is located in the province.

History
In the 19th century, during the French Indochina period, Kampot became a regional administrative center with the status of a state border district as a result of the delimitation of the Kingdom of Cambodia. The Circonscription Résidentielle de Kampot contained the arrondissements of Kampot, Kompong-Som, Trang and Kong-Pisey.

In 1889, French colonial census reports a multi-ethnic community: Kampot town consisted of "Cambodian Kampot" on the Prek-Kampot River and "Chinese Kampot" on the right riverbank of the west branch of the Prek-Thom River. Nearby was also a Vietnamese village, called Tien-Thanh and another Vietnamese village on Traeuy Koh Island. A Malay also existed on Traeuy Koh Island. Additional villages of mixed ethnicity are listed.

Khmer Rouge era
Destruction and mass murder happened throughout the whole area of Kampot province, as the Cambodian genocide and bloody massacres engulfed Kampot province under the terror of Khmer Rouge rule. A total 90,450 persons were massacred throughout the province. Ta Mok himself massacred 30,000 people in the Angkor Chey District of Kampot.

Economy

Agriculture
 Kampot pepper is a specialized product, protected by GI law, totaling 13 ha and a harvesting area of 10.50 ha located in Domnak Kantoul, Kang Tboung Commune, Kompong Trach District.
 Durian, another specialized product totaling 537 ha and yielding 10,657 tons located in Makbrang Commune, Tek Chhou district.
 Rubber, plantation area: 20 ha
 Kampot sea salt is extracted from the seawater through salt evaporation ponds in the coastal areas of Kampot and Kep provinces.

Forestry and mining
 Forestry area: 227,154 ha
 48 Mineral production and mining areas

Tourism
 Historical/cultural areas: 4 places
 Wildlife sanctuaries and protected areas: Preah Monivong National Park at 140,000 hectares

Districts
The province is subdivided into 7 districts and 1 municipality.

Gallery

References

External links

 The 2010 Kampot Provincial Investment Profile by USAID and the Provincial Administration

 
Provinces of Cambodia
Gulf of Thailand
States and territories established in 1923